Bacillus cereus biovar anthracis is a variant of the Bacillus cereus bacterium that has acquired plasmids similar to those of Bacillus anthracis. As a result, it is capable of causing anthrax. In 2016, it was added to the CDC's list of select agents and toxins.

Bacillus cereus biovar anthracis infection has caused significant mortality in numerous mammalian species, including chimpanzees.

See also 
 Biovar

References 

cereus biovar
Anthrax
Biovars